Permatang is a state constituency in the Selangor State Legislative Assembly, located in Selangor, Malaysia. The constituency has existed since 1974.

The state constituency was created in the 1974 redistribution and is mandated to return a single member to the Selangor State Legislative Assembly under the first past the post voting system. , the State Assemblyman for Permatang is Rozana Zainal Abidin from Parti Keadilan Rakyat (PKR) — which is part of the state's ruling coalition, Pakatan Harapan (PH).

Demographics

History

Polling districts 
According to the gazette issued on 30 March 2018, the Permatang constituency has a total of 19 polling districts.

Representation history

Election results

References

Selangor state constituencies